Gobir (Demonym: Gobirawa) was a city-state in what is now Nigeria. Founded by the Hausa in the 11th century, Gobir was one of the seven original kingdoms of Hausaland, and continued under Hausa rule for nearly 700 years. Its capital was the city of Alkalawa. In the early 19th century elements of the ruling dynasty fled north to what is today Niger from which a rival dynasty developed ruling as Sarkin Gobir (Sultan of Gobir) at Tibiri. In 1975 a reunited traditional sultanate took up residence in Sabon Birni, Nigeria.

History

Early history
Gobir was one of the seven original kingdoms of Hausaland, tracing a lineage back to the 11th century. The seat of the dynasty was at Alkalawa, in northwestern Hausaland.

Fulani jihad
Gobir is particularly remembered as the chief opponent of Fulani Islamic reformer Usman dan Fodio. Bawa, a ruler of Gobir, appears to have invited dan Fodio to the area in 1774; dan Fodio made his home in the small town of Degel, and began preaching. Dan Fodio was given some role in the education of Bawa's nephew and later successor, Yunfa (r. 1803–8), but also publicly attacked what he saw as the abuses of the Hausa elite, particularly the burden they placed on the poor. Sarki Nafata (r. 1797–98) reversed Bawa's tolerant policy, and feared the increase of arms amongst dan Fodio's followers. The next two rulers vacillated between repressive and liberal measures.

When Yunfa took the throne in 1803, he soon found himself in conflict with dan Fodio, and after failing to assassinate him, exiled dan Fodio and his followers from Degel. Dan Fodio responded by assembling the nomadic Fulani clans into a jihadist army, beginning the Fulani War and eventually establishing the Sokoto Caliphate. Despite some initial successes by the forces of Gobir and the other Hausaland states (most notably at the Battle of Tsuntua), dan Fodio managed to conquer the surrounding territory. His forces seized the Gobir capital, Alkalawa, in October 1808, killing Sarki Yunfa. The state was then partially absorbed into Sokoto.

Flight
Resistance against the Jihadists was continued in the north-east by Sarkin Ali dan Yakubu and Sarki Mayaki. With the help of the Hausa ruler of Katsina the latter built a new capital of Gobir in Tibiri, 10 km north of Maradi in 1836. When the Gobir Sultan revolted against the Sokoto Caliphate that same year, Sokoto Sultan Muhammed Bello crushed the rebellion at the Battle of Gawakuke. Here in present Niger the old dynasty of the Hausa rulers of Gobir is still continued today. A rival branch of the dynasty has its seat in Sabon Birni north of Sokoto in Nigeria.

The former Sarkin Gobir Muhammadu Bawa ruled in Sabon Birni from 1975 to 2004.

References

Citation

Bibliography 
"Usman dan Fodio." Encyclopædia Britannica Online, accessed September 30, 2005.
F. Daniel. "Shehu dan Fodio." Journal of the Royal African Society 25.99 (Apr 1926): 278-283.
Kühme, Walter. Das Königtum von Gobir, Hamburg 2003.
Boubou Hama. Histoire du Gobir et de Sokoto. Présence africaine (Paris/Dakar), 1967.
List of rulers of Gobir
Igba Rumun Vishigh. CHRISTIANITY AND ISLAM IN DIALOGUE: NORTHWEST NIGERIA, 1960-1990. University of Jos, Nigeria (1997).
Muhammad Sharee. Shehu Uthman Dan Fuduye’. Institute of Islamic - African Studies (1999).
 											 						 													    		 				 			La vie d’une cour de chefferie : le Gobir hier et aujourd’hui. Zeinabou Gaoh, ONEP Maradi, Le Sahel (Niger). 30 October 2009.

History of Nigeria
Nigerian traditional states